The Hits Chapter 1 is the first greatest hits album released by American country music artist Sammy Kershaw. It was issued in 1995 (see 1995 in country music) on the Mercury Records label. The album comprises the ten greatest hits from his first three studio albums: four each from 1991's Don't Go Near the Water and 1993's Haunted Heart, plus two more from 1994's Feelin' Good Train. Also included are "Still Lovin' You" (the third track from Haunted Heart, never released as a single) and the new track "Your Tattoo", which was released as a single in 1995 and peaked at #47 on the country charts. The Hits Chapter 1 earned a gold certification from the RIAA for shipping 500,000 copies in the United States on September 8, 1997.

Track listing

Charts

Certification

References

1995 greatest hits albums
Sammy Kershaw albums
Albums produced by Buddy Cannon
Albums produced by Norro Wilson
Mercury Records compilation albums